Francis Blase Delehanty (February 3, 1859 - October 7, 1932) was a justice of the New York Supreme Court.

Biography
He was born on February 3, 1859, to Michael Delehanty and Mary Quinn in Albany, New York.

He married Annie Ceclia.

He died on October 7, 1932.

References

New York Supreme Court Justices
1859 births
1932 deaths